Arneth is a surname. Notable people with the surname include:

Joseph Calasanza, Ritter von Arneth (1791–1863), Austrian numismatist and archæologist
Alfred Ritter von Arneth (1819, Vienna – 1897), Austrian historian, son of Joseph
Josef Arneth (1873, Burgkunstadt – 1955), German physician and haematologist known for naming the Arneth count
Arneth count or Arneth index describes the nucleus of a type of white blood cell called a neutrophil in an attempt to detect disease

German-language surnames
Austrian noble families